Bellevue (French for "beautiful view"; previously named Belleview) is a suburban city in Sarpy County, Nebraska, United States. It is part of the Omaha–Council Bluffs metropolitan area, and had a population of 64,176 as of the 2020 Census, making it the third-largest city in Nebraska, behind Omaha and Lincoln, and the second largest city in the U.S. named "Bellevue," behind Bellevue, Washington. 

Originally settled by European Americans in the 1830s, Bellevue was incorporated in 1855 and is the oldest continuous town in Nebraska. It has been credited by the Nebraska State Legislature as being the state's second-oldest settlement; previously it served as the seat of government in Nebraska.

Geography
Bellevue is located at an elevation of 1159  ft (353 m). It is bounded on the east by the Missouri River.

History 
Bellevue was originally founded as a trading post for the Missouri Fur Company by Joshua Pilcher, but there were financial problems, and, eventually, Lucien Fontanelle became the owner of the post, and the first permanent resident of Bellevue. Moses Merrill founded a mission, which was the first Christian mission in Nebraska, in Bellevue. Since it was the oldest city in the Nebraska Territory, the residents were optimistic that Bellevue would become the capital of it, and the new territorial governor, Francis Burt, had already moved there, but shortly after, he died. The next governor selected Omaha as the capital instead. In 1921, the Offutt Air Force Base, housing the United States Strategic Command, was built south of Bellevue. The planes that dropped the Hiroshima and Nagasaki atomic bombs were built there.

Demographics

2010 census
At the 2010 census there were 50,137 people, 19,142 households, and 13,371 families living in the city. The racial makeup of the city was 81.5% White, 6.0% African American, 0.7% Native American, 2.3% Asian, 0.2% Pacific Islander, 5.4% from other races, and 3.9% from two or more races. Hispanic or Latino of any race were 11.9%.

Of the 19,142 households 36.1% had children under the age of 18 living with them, 51.9% were married couples living together, 13.0% had a female householder with no husband present, 5.0% had a male householder with no wife present, and 30.1% were non-families. 24.3% of households were one person and 7.9% were one person aged 65 or older. The average household size was 2.62 and the average family size was 3.11.

The median age was 34.8 years. 26.4% of residents were under the age of 18; 9.8% were between the ages of 18 and 24; 26.7% were from 25 to 44; 25.6% were from 45 to 64; and 11.5% were 65 or older. The gender makeup of the city was 49.2% male and 50.8% female.

2000 census
At the 2000 census, there were 44,382 people, 16,937 households, and 11,940 families living in the city. The population density was 3,346.4 people per square mile (1,292.3/km). There were 17,439 housing units at an average density of 1,314.9 per square mile (507.8/km). The racial makeup of the city was 85.83% White, 6.13% African American, 0.50% Native American, 2.11% Asian, 0.11% Pacific Islander, 2.78% from other races, and 2.54% from two or more races. Hispanic or Latino of any race were 5.88% of the population.

Of the 16,937 households 35.5% had children under the age of 18 living with them, 55.4% were married couples living together, 11.3% had a female householder with no husband present, and 29.5% were non-families. 23.2% of households were one person and 6.6% were one person aged 65 or older. The average household size was 2.61 and the average family size was 3.09.

The age distribution was 27.4% under the age of 18, 10.2% from 18 to 24, 31.0% from 25 to 44, 21.8% from 45 to 64, and 9.6% 65 or older. The median age was 34 years. For every 100 females, there were 98.3 males. For every 100 females age 18 and over, there were 95.6 males.

The median household income was $47,201 and the median family income  was $54,422. Males had a median income of $33,819 versus $25,783 for females. The per capita income for the city was $20,903. About 4.1% of families and 5.9% of the population were below the poverty line, including 7.9% of those under age 18 and 3.8% of those age 65 or over.

Education
School districts including portions of Bellevue include:
 Bellevue Public Schools
 Omaha Public Schools
 Papillion-La Vista Community Schools
 Springfield Platteview Community Schools

Notable people

 Buddy Carlyle, Major League Baseball pitcher and coach
 Henry T. Clarke Sr., merchant and legislator, father of Henry Clarke
 Henry Clarke, legislator and baseball player
 Tyler Cloyd, baseball pitcher
 Abbie Cornett, Nebraska state legislator
 William Forsee, Presidential elector
 Bob Gibson, baseball player and hall of famer
 Leisha Hailey, actress, musician
 Robert Hays, actor known for his film role as pilot Ted Striker in the movie Airplane!
 Manny Lawson, football player
 Thakoon Panichgul, Thai-American Fashion Designer
 Todd Pratt, Former New York Mets baseball catcher.
 Don Preister, Nebraska State Senator
 Terry D. Scott, tenth Master Chief Petty Officer of the Navy (MCPON)
 Molly Schuyler, competitive eating champion
 Yvonne Turner, WNBA Basketball Player
 Regis F. A. Urschler, USAF Brigadier General and P-51 air show pilot

See also
 Bellevue Public Schools
 Great Plains Art Museum
 Moses Merill Mission
 Offutt Air Force Base
 United States Strategic Command
 Sarpy County Historical Museum
 Nebraska Medicine- Bellevue

References

External links

 City of Bellevue Website
 Bellevue Chamber of Commerce

 
Cities in Nebraska
Cities in Sarpy County, Nebraska
Nebraska populated places on the Missouri River
1855 establishments in Nebraska Territory